Montpelier (also Crosstown, LaCross) is an unincorporated community in Clay County, Mississippi, United States. It is located along Mississippi Highway 46 in the northwestern part of the county. The community contains West Clay Elementary School.

A post office first began operation under the name Montpelier in 1853.

Montpelier's Historic District is listed on the National Register of Historic Places.

Notes

Unincorporated communities in Clay County, Mississippi
Unincorporated communities in Mississippi